White Whale Records was an American independent record label, founded in 1965 by Ted Feigin and Lee Lasseff in Los Angeles, California, and probably best known as the record label of The Turtles and a handful of one-hit wonder bands.

White Whale, in addition to releasing almost all of The Turtles' discography, also released Nino Tempo & April Stevens's single "All Strung Out (On You)", a hit single by Rene y Rene titled "Lo Mucho Que Ti Quiero", an album by Liz Damon's Orient Express, and the only album by Texas band The Clique. Warren Zevon was a staff songwriter for the label, and they issued some of his earliest recordings (as part of the duo Lyme & Cybele). Dobie Gray also recorded for the label, recording the first chart version of "I Never Promised You a Rose Garden," which later became a much bigger hit for Lynn Anderson.

Three compilations of singles from the label have been released on CD: Happy Together: The Very Best of White Whale Records, and two volumes of the Phantom Jukebox series, on Rev-Ola records.

The Turtles 
When White Whale signed the Turtles, they were known as "The Crossfires"; a surf music band looking to change their style, as surf music was fading. The label encouraged a name change to "The Tyrtles", in the manner of The Beatles and The Byrds. The band accepted the new name, but not the variant spelling. Relations between the label and the band were not always smooth, with White Whale pressuring the band for "more hits", then for singers Howard Kaylan and Mark Volman to fire the rest of the group, and work instead with hired musicians, in order to save money. Kaylan wrote the song "Elenore" as a humorous take on "Happy Together" (the only #1 hit for both the group and the White Whale label), which ironically became a hit itself. He and Volman also democratized the group, insisting everyone share in the writing and vocal duties, despite what the label wanted, and recorded a concept album, The Turtles Present the Battle of the Bands (on which "Elenore" was featured).

When the Turtles disbanded in the early 1970s, White Whale lost their big moneymaker; in retaliation, and to prevent Kaylan and Volman from continuing their musical careers, White Whale insisted they held the rights to not only the Turtles' name and back catalog, but Kaylan and Volman's individual given names. Kaylan and Volman responded by moving into session work and continuing under a pseudonym, Flo and Eddie; White Whale Records, on the other hand, went out of business not long after. The label's final releases were the single "1900 Yesterday" by Liz Damon's Orient Express and a self-titled album by the same group; although both charted (the single reaching a respectable #33), it wasn't enough to keep the company going. White Whale's assets were sold at auction in 1974, at which point Kaylan and Volman won the rights to the Turtles' master recordings. Kaylan and Volman would not earn the rights to their own names (or the Turtles') again until 1983.

Anthem Records 
Feigin and Lasseff folded White Whale Records in 1971 and created a new label called Anthem Records (not to be confused with the later Canadian label of the same name.) Anthem was initially distributed in the US by United Artists. Two White Whale acts were transferred to Anthem (Liz Damon's Orient Express and The Dillards), and they are the only artists to have albums issued on the label. The label also provided US distribution for a single by Freddie Mercury under the alias "Larry Lurex". One of Anthem's last signings was the duo of Lindsey Buckingham and Stevie Nicks, whose Buckingham Nicks LP was released via Polydor in 1973. (Polydor issued several albums with credits to "Anthem Record Productions" after the label lost distribution with United Artists the previous year.) Anthem Records was officially dissolved that same year.

Current ownership 
While Flo & Eddie Inc (distributed by The Orchard) controls The Turtles' catalog, the rest of the White Whale catalog is currently controlled by Concord Music's Craft Recordings under Varese Sarabande. Since the '90s, several CD reissues and compilations of White Whale material have been released.

Chart history

Billboard Top LPs Chart

Billboard Hot 100 & Bubbling Under Charts

See also 
 List of record labels

References

External links
White Whale Records
White Whale singles
 White Whale USA singles discography

American record labels
Record labels established in 1965
Record labels disestablished in 1971